Avigail is a Hebrew name, see "Abigail" for its history and etymology. Notable people with the name include:

 Avigail Alfatov (born 1996), Israeli national fencing champion, soldier, and Miss Israel 2014
Avigail Sperber (born 1973), Israeli cinematographer 
Avigail Kovari, Israeli singer, musician, and television and film actress
Olga Avigail Mieleszczuk, Israeli singer, accordion player and researcher of Eastern European musical folklore

See also